Holy Rosary College (previously known as Holy Rosary Secondary School), is a Roman Catholic, all-girls secondary school in Old GRA, a neighborhood of Port Harcourt, the capital of Rivers State, Nigeria.

History

It was established in 1956 and is run by the Holy Rosary Sisters. It is located in the Diocese of Port Harcourt, currently led by Camillus Archibong Etokudoh.
The serving principal, as of February 2014 is Veronica Efika.

Notable alumni
Ann-Kio Briggs - Environmental and human rights activist
Felicity Okpete Ovai - engineer, academic
Mary Uranta - actress

See also

List of schools in Port Harcourt
Roman Catholic Diocese of Port Harcourt

References

External links

Girls' schools in Rivers State
Schools in Port Harcourt
Secondary schools in Rivers State
Old GRA, Port Harcourt
Roman Catholic Diocese of Port Harcourt
Educational institutions established in 1956
1956 establishments in Nigeria